Pangsuma Airport  is an airport in Putussibau, West Kalimantan, Indonesia. The distance between the Airport and Putussibau is 3.7 km via Jl. Lintas Kalimantan Poros Utara. Putussibau is the capital of Kapuas Hulu within approximately 400 km from Pontianak. The town is the gateway to the two major eco-tourism destinations in the heart of Borneo, Danau Sentarum National Park and Betung Kerihun National Park.

The airport is managed and controlled by UPT Ditjen Hubud, an agency under Ministry of Transportation, Indonesia. Throughout 2016, it served 73,662 passengers.

Airlines and destinations

The following airlines offer scheduled passenger service:

Statistic

References

External links
Pangsuma Airport - Indonesia Airport global website
 

Airports in West Kalimantan